The 1937 USSR Chess Championship was the 10th edition of USSR Chess Championship. Held from 12 April to 14 May 1937 in Tbilisi. The tournament was won by Grigory Levenfish. Qualification was by way of the championships of Moscow, Leningrad,  Kiev, as well as various other events. In October and November 1937, Botvnnik and Levenfish played a match for the Soviet title, which ended in a draw (+5 -5 =3). So Levenfish kept the title.

Table and results

References 

USSR Chess Championships
Championship
Chess
1937 in chess
Chess